A bow rider is a kind of runabout boat with an offset helm and extra forward seating.  They are between 17' and 35', use stern drive or outboard engines, and hold between six and ten people. Its open bow area distinguishes it from a cuddy boat.

This term can be confused with bow riding, a dangerous and often illegal activity involving sitting or standing on the bow while the boat is underway.

They are well suited for many recreational water sports such as tubing, water skiing, and swimming; however, a center console or walkaround type boat is more practical for fishing.  Bow riders are well suited for lakes and inland water.  In heavy seas, the open bow and lower gunwales may cause heavy spray, and the boat can take on water.

Characteristics
A bow rider or bowrider is a type of boat which has a seating area in the bow, the forward part of the ship. Bow riders  are generally designed for recreational use such as day cruising or water skiing, and they come in a variety of styles from luxurious to basic. Several manufacturers of boats produce bow riders, in both mass production and custom models for their customers, and such boats are often available for rental at facilities which offer boats for rent to people who do not maintain their own watercraft.

On a bow rider, the area in front of the helm can be used for seating or lounging. Protective rails designed to prevent falls are installed, along with seats which may include seat belts, depending on the boat design. A flat deck is designed with a nonslip surface so that people can walk comfortably, and some bow riders have enough space for people to stretch out and lie down, with people using the area as a sun pad.

This type of runabout boat is powered by a variety of types of engine, depending on the size of the boat and the style. Some are designed to go quite fast, while others are intended to be used for more casual cruising. The design is most well suited to inland waterways and calm lakes, not the open ocean. Like other runabouts, a bow rider lacks accommodations such as sleeping spaces, a galley, and a bathroom, since it is intended for short day use only. A more luxuriously outfitted boat can include padded seating, small wet bars, and other features which are designed to enhance passenger comfort and enjoyment.

References

Boat types
Nautical terminology